Simon Plouffe (born June 11, 1956) is a mathematician who discovered the Bailey–Borwein–Plouffe formula (BBP algorithm) which permits the computation of the nth binary digit of π, in 1995. He was born in Saint-Jovite, Quebec.

He co-authored The Encyclopedia of Integer Sequences, made into the web site On-Line Encyclopedia of Integer Sequences dedicated to integer sequences later in 1995. In 1975, Plouffe broke the world record for memorizing digits of π by reciting 4096 digits, a record which stood until 1977.

See also
Fabrice Bellard, who discovered in 1997 a faster formula to compute pi.
PiHex

Notes

External links
 
 
 Plouffe website (in French)
 
 N. J. A. Sloane and S. Plouffe, The Encyclopedia of Integer Sequences, Academic Press, San Diego, 1995, 587 pp. . 

1956 births
Living people
Canadian mathematicians
French Quebecers
People from Laurentides